Hervé William Bodiong Andiolo (born 17 June 1997) is a Cameroonian professional footballer who plays as a midfielder for Nea Salamina.

Career
He began his career at TAD Sport Academy in Yaoundé.

Bodiong joined PO Xylotymbou in Cyprus ahead of the 2019–20 season.

References 

Living people
1997 births
Association football midfielders
Cameroonian footballers
Cameroon under-20 international footballers
Cameroonian expatriate footballers
Expatriate footballers in Cyprus
AEP Paphos FC players
Akritas Chlorakas players
PAEEK players
ASIL Lysi players
P.O. Xylotymbou players
Nea Salamis Famagusta FC players
Cypriot First Division players
Cypriot Second Division players